Naukri.com is an Indian employment website operating in India and Middle East. It was founded in March 1997 by Indian businessman Sanjeev Bikhchandani. Naukri.com is the largest employment website in India.

History and milestones

Naukri.com was launched on 27 March 1997. The company was started as a floorless employment exchange. It was a database of resume, jobs, and recruitment consultants. Conceived as a platform of job seekers and hiring managers to meet, the services went commercial in October 1997.

It all started when Sanjeev Bikhchandani quit his corporate job at Hindustan Milkfood Manufacturers (now Glaxo Smithkline) and founded two companies with his partner - Info Edge (for arranging database) and Indmark (pharmaceutical) . Info Edge offered salary reports to various categories of college graduates such as engineering and MBAs. Salary reports were sold to companies, somewhere between 5000 and 10,000 INR. Sanjeev and his business partner at Info Edge operated from servants’ quarter located in Sanjeev's home.

In 1991, The Department of Telecom (DoT) advertised for videotex services. Info Edge submitted the business plan to DoT and it was shortlisted.  Reasons undisclosed, the department canceled the pilot project.  This was a setback and Sanjeev and his business partner parted ways. His partner took Indmark and he was left in charge of Info Edge.

During a visit to an IT fair at Delhi's fairground (Pragati Maidan), he was drawn to a stall written WWW Curious, Sanjeev found more about how the Internet worked. The Internet was new in India in the 90s. He took help from his brother Sushil who was residing in the US to hire a server. The server was hired at a monthly rent of $25.

This is how Info Edge India, which was then a holding company of Naukri.com was started. On 1 May 1995, it became Info Edge (India) Private Limited.

In 1996, the recession hit and the company suffered loss. It was then Sanjeev took help from his friend Anil Lall and shared the thought of creating the website.  Anil Lall was offered a 7 percent share in the company. Another friend, VN Saroja took care of the operations.  She was made 9 percent shareholder in the company.

Naukri.com was launched on 2 April 1997 and the first version of the website had 1000 jobs collected from 29 newspapers. Reviews of business magazines, newspapers and word-of-mouth followed. Jobseekers learned job search on Naukri was free, and soon more people started logging in. Traffic on Naukri.com slowly and steadily increased.

In 2012, the company launched mobile apps for Blackberry, Android and iPhone devices and reportedly received 23% of its traffic from mobile users in 2013.

Naming issues

The website has faced problems with competitors registering websites with names similar to naukri.com. The World Intellectual Property Organization (WIPO) ordered Abs IT Solutions to transfer the domain naukarie.com to Info Edge India.

Business model

The website follows Business-to-Business and Business-to-consumer models.

Revenue sources

Subscription fees and advertising are two ways the website generates revenue. 90 percent of the revenue earned is from the recruiters (B-2-B). 10 percent of the income sources are from jobseeker services.

Awards and recognition
 2006 - Received the Consumer Connect 'Campaign of the Year' award for the Hari Sadu Commercial at the Advertising Club, Kolkata.
 2007 - Won the ‘Best TVC India and South Asia’ at the CASBAA TV Advertising Awards 2007 for the Hari Sadu "Name Calling" commercial.
 2014 - Received the Best Website of the Year (WOTY) award in the career and education segment by Metrixlab.

 2018: Won Gold in 2018 Prime awards for the best consumer-centric campaign 

 2020: Won ET Iconic Brands of India 2020 Award

See also
 Employment website
 List of employment websites

References

Online companies of India
Employment websites in India
Internet properties established in 1997
Companies based in Noida
Indian companies established in 1997
Business services companies established in 1997
Online marketplaces of India
Professional networks